Jón Leósson (23 February 1935 – 12 May 2013) was an Icelandic footballer. He played in seven matches for the Iceland national football team from 1957 to 1964.

References

External links
 

1935 births
2013 deaths
Jon Leosson
Jon Leosson
Place of birth missing
Association footballers not categorized by position